William Avery (circa 1622-March 18, 1686) represented Dedham, Massachusetts, in the Great and General Court. He was also a selectman, serving eight terms beginning in 1664.

Avery was a blacksmith, medical doctor, and original proprietor of Deerfield, Massachusetts. Avery was the first educated physician in Dedham, though it is not known when exactly he began practicing. He sold some land to Joshua Fisher.

He was a member of the First Church and Parish in Dedham. Avery built his house next to the Old Avery Oak, which was named for his family.

With his wife, Margret, he emigrated from England. After her death in 1678 he moved to Boston where he became a bookseller. His second wife was Mrs. Mary Tapping. She died in 1707. He had a son, also named William, who was a blacksmith. With his wife, Margret, he emigrated from England. After her death in 1678 he moved to Boston where he became a bookseller.

Avery died on March 18, 1686, and is buried at the King's Chapel Burying Ground. For having donated £60 to establish a Latin school in Dedham, the Avery School was named for him.

Notes

References

Works cited

Members of the colonial Massachusetts General Court from Dedham
People from Deerfield, Massachusetts
People from Boston
1620s births
1686 deaths
Year of birth uncertain
Burials at King's Chapel Burying Ground
Kingdom of England emigrants to Massachusetts Bay Colony
Dedham, Massachusetts selectmen
Signers of the Dedham Covenant